The 2017 Sun Belt Conference baseball tournament was held at J. I. Clements Stadium on the campus of Georgia Southern University in Statesboro, Georgia, from May 24 to May 28, 2017, using a double-elimination format. The winner of the tournament earned the Sun Belt Conference's automatic bid to the 2017 NCAA Division I baseball tournament.

Seeding
In a change from previous years, the seeding for the tournament was modified with the re-introduction of division play.  The #1 seed would be the division winner with the best record, and the other division winner would be the #2 seed.  This would reward each division winner for winning their division.  Once the #1 seed is determined, the other division winner is automatically granted the #2 seed, even if that team's overall conference record isn't the second best.  Seeds 3–10 are then assigned regardless of division based on conference winning percentage, with the bottom four seeds competing in a play-in round.  The remaining eight teams will then play a two bracket, double-elimination tournament. The winner of each bracket will play a championship final.

Schedule

Due to poor field conditions and the threat of further inclement weather the first round of the tournament was postponed. Alternative sites and make-up schedules are being examined. On May 24 the Sun Belt announced that the tournament would move to a single elimination format.

Bracket

Play-in round
The first two matchups of the tournament were single-elimination and were be held on Thursday May 25, 2017.

Single-elimination round
Coastal Carolina  faced the team that won on the day before with the lowest seed with the other winner against Texas-Arlington. The tournament was originally scheduled to be a double elimination tournament. Due to weather and poor field conditions they had to make the tournament single elimination.

References

Tournament
Sun Belt Conference Baseball Tournament
Sun Belt Conference baseball tournament
Sun Belt Conference baseball tournament